Altıntaş is a Turkish surname. Its meaning in the Turkish language is "Goldstone".

Notable people with the surname include:

 Batuhan Altıntaş (footballer) (born 1996), Turkish footballer
 Batuhan Altıntaş (sprinter) (born 1996), Turkish track and field runner
 Mevlüt Mert Altıntaş (1994-2016) Turkish off duty officer and assassin of the Russian diplomat Andrei Karlov
 Tolga Altıntaş (born 1980), Turkish volleyball player
 Hakan Ramazan Altıntaş (born 1999), Turkish sprinter
 Tülin Altıntaş (born 1982), Turkish volleyball player
 Yusuf Altıntaş (born 1961), Turkish football former player and coach

Turkish-language surnames